The Federal Home Loan Bank Board Building is an historic structure located in Downtown Washington, D.C.  It was listed on the National Register of Historic Places in 2007.

History
The structure was built to house the Acacia Mutual Insurance Company, which was the only federally chartered life insurance company. It was incorporated in 1869 as the Masonic Mutual Relief Association of the District of Columbia.   The Federal government took possession of the building in 1934 to house the Federal Home Loan Bank Board, which is how the building acquired its name in 1937.  It was a New Deal program that supported home ownership.

Architecture
George E. Mathews of the architectural firm of Hoggson Brothers was the original architect for the building.   Louis A. Simon of the Public Works Branch in the Department of the Treasury was the architect for an addition that was built from 1935 to 1937.  The building exemplifies early-20th-century Classical Revival intuitional office architecture.  The exterior features facades covered with limestone with classical detail.  The interior features an ornamented lobby.

References

External links
 

1928 establishments in Washington, D.C.
Bank buildings on the National Register of Historic Places in Washington, D.C.
Neoclassical architecture in Washington, D.C.
Office buildings completed in 1928
Office buildings in Washington, D.C.
Office buildings on the National Register of Historic Places in Washington, D.C.